Ophiclinops varius, the Variegated snake-blenny, is a species of clinids found in the coastal waters of southern Australia where it resides in beds of Amphibolis seagrasses. It can reach a maximum length of  TL.

References

varius
Fish described in 1918
Taxa named by Allan Riverstone McCulloch
Taxa named by Edgar Ravenswood Waite